Saint Andrew's School is a pre-kindergarten through Grade 12, day and boarding school in Boca Raton, Florida. As a day and boarding school in the Episcopal tradition, Saint Andrew’s serves 1,335 students from over 40 countries and several states. The school, which offers Honors, Advanced Placement (AP), and International Baccalaureate (IB) courses, is seen locally as one of the area's top schools.

History
Saint Andrew's School began as a boarding high school for boys, and was founded by the Episcopal School Foundation in 1961, led by The Rev. Hunter Wyatt-Brown Jr., who became the first headmaster.  The late Alexander D. Henderson Jr., a retired Avon Products, Inc. executive, and his wife, Lucy (Lucia Maria Ernst), provided significant private donations during the early years.  The Hendersons donated a substantial portion of the start-up funding while the property itself, which was located on an unused section of the Butts Farm west of Boca Raton, was donated by the ARVIDA corporation and the Butts family with the condition that a Christian school be established there.  This agreement later included in the school by-laws that the Bishop of the Episcopal Diocese of Southeast Florida be an ex officio member of the Board of Trustees.  The School opened on September 21, 1962, with 122 boarding and day students from as far away as Rio de Janeiro, Brazil, and several states including Michigan, New York, and Ohio using the English system of Forms 1 (7th grade) through 6 (12th grade).

The School served as the original full-time training camp and practice facility for the Miami Dolphins in the mid-1960s through 1969 and in 1968 served as the training facility to the Baltimore Colts for Super Bowl III. The campus and facilities also served as the filming location for the 1968 movie Paper Lion starring Alan Alda, Lauren Hutton, Roy Scheider, and Alex Karras adapted from the George Plimpton autobiographical pro football book of the same name. In 1977, the School served as camp HQ for the PGA National Academy of Golf that included exhibitions and instruction by Julius Boros and Andy North.  In 2011, the Scots Summer Tennis camp included an exhibition by David Wheaton.

The first group of girls as boarding students were admitted in 1972. Saint Andrew's School added a Lower School in 2000 and a Junior Kindergarten program in 2008. In 2010, the Saint Andrew's School began offering the International Baccalaureate Diploma program as an IB World School and in 2011, the school was accepted as a full international member of the Round Square Organization and was declared a "Green School of Excellence."  In 2013, Saint Andrew's School hosted the Round Square International Conference with over 750 educators and international students attending, including Prince Andrew, Duke of York.

Over the last fifteen years, more than $30 million in new plant construction and renovation projects have been completed. The capital projects include a new welcome center, multiple gymnasiums with one featuring a rock climbing wall, a dance studio, a new track and field, the renovation of the administrative buildings, a track and field facility, a science building, and a preschool. The school has also constructed a new Head of School residence and erected a replica of the original Chickee Chapel that had been built by the Miccosukee Seminole Indian tribe with which the early school had a close relationship. The idea for that chapel and several 'carports' of the same construction that dotted the campus in its early years was the brainchild of Father Raymond M. O'Brien, an original founding faculty member and the school's chaplain, Latin/Theology teacher, and Classical Language Department Head, as a continuing symbol of School heritage. The original altar front, a Seminole princess painted native nativity scene commissioned by Fr. O'Brien, now hangs on display in Saint Andrew's Chapel on campus. In 2015, SAS embarked on a new campus master plan, which made improvements and enhancements in the Middle and Upper School areas, including the introduction of the Dr. Albert Cohen Family Center for Entrepreneurial Studies in 2018. In 2019, Justin Hall, which houses the school's Advancement Office, was constructed and Andrews Hall in the Upper School was renovated. In 2021, the next phase involved the total renovation of Henderson Hall into the new home of the Parker Library.

Leadership
Saint Andrew's School has had ten headmasters including The Rev. Hunter Wyatt-Brown Jr. (serving 1962–1963) and Eugene Curtis Jr. (serving 1964–1971). Dr. Ann Marie Krejcarek was the school's first female head of school (2007 -2012), replacing Rev. George E. Andrews II (serving 1989–2007). In 2013, Peter. B. Benedict II joined the Saint Andrew's community as its ninth headmaster. In July 2017, Ethan Shapiro arrived at Saint Andrew's School to serve as interim headmaster and was named Head of School on January 1, 2019.

The school has two chaplains, Head Chaplain The Rev. Dr. Benjamin Anthony and The Rev. Dr. David Taylor, who officiate at the chapel services, which are held once per week. Upper and Middle School chapel services are held in the Chapel of Saint Andrew (the Apostle), which is also home to an active parish in the Episcopal Diocese of Southeast Florida.

Notable alumni

Corina Morariu – Tennis Player
Catalina Pérez - Soccer Player currently with Real Betis Féminas
Morgan Pressel – Golfer
Vincent Spadea – Tennis Player
Michael Yani - Tennis Player
Phil Shaouy - Music Producer
Kendra Erika - Recording Artist
Danny Young, Baseball Player currently with the Seattle Mariners
Jake Bargas - American Football currently with the Minnesota Vikings
Anthony Polite - Professional basketball player for the San Antonio Spurs
Josh Minott - Professional basketball player for the Minnesota Timberwolves
Steve Geffrard - Professional boxer

References

External links
Official website

Boarding schools in Florida
Private high schools in Florida
Educational institutions established in 1962
Episcopal schools in the United States
High schools in Palm Beach County, Florida
Buildings and structures in Boca Raton, Florida
Private middle schools in Florida
Private elementary schools in Florida
1962 establishments in Florida